The Order of Duke Trpimir, or more fully the Order of Duke Trpimir with Neck Badge and Morning Star (Red kneza Trpimira s ogrlicom i Danicom), is an order of the Republic of Croatia. It ranks sixth in the Croatian order of precedence after the Grand Order of King Dmitar Zvonimir.  It is awarded to Croatian and foreign ministerial level officials and others for merit in contributing to the independence, integrity and international reputation of the Republic of Croatia, the construction of Croatia, and development of relationships between Croatia and other countries.

Description

The badge of the order is a diamond-shaped red-enameled badge featuring an interwoven wattle pattern in silver, with a round white-enameled disk in the center, bordered in silver. On the disk is an equestrian representation of Duke Trpimir, a medieval Prince of Dalmatia and Duke of Croats.  On the lower part of the silver border is the name "TRPIMIR".

The star of the order features the center medallion as above, but with a gilt rather than silver border, on a star with eight longer and eight shorter silver rays, with gold rays between.

Notable recipients

 Wesley Clark – U.S. general and Supreme Allied Commander, Europe during the Kosovo War
 Ingo Friedrich (2006) – German Member of the European Parliament and then-Vice President of the European Parliament.
 msgr. Giulio Einaudi – first Apostolic Nuncio to Croatia
 Sonja Biserko – Serbian compaigner for human rights, founder and president of the Helsinki Committee for Human Rights in Serbia
 Bogić Bogićević – representative of Bosnia and Herzegovina in the Presidency of Yugoslavia from 1989 to 1991
 Peter Galbraith – first Ambassador of the United States to Croatia
Haris Silajdžić (1995) – Prime Minister of the Republic of Bosnia and Herzegovina 
 msgr. Ćiril Kos
 Hans Dietrich Genscher
 Anton Tus
 Ivan Lacković-Croata
 Sveto Letica
 Vinko Nikolić
 Slobodan Novak
 Doris Pack
 Ivan Rabuzin
 Ivo Sanader – revoked 
 Dragutin Tadijanović
 Luka Bebić
 Ivan Čermak
 Zlatko Mateša
 Branko Mikša
 Philip M. Hannan
 Branko Lustig
 Hans Mayer
 Hikmet Çetin
 Klaus Nöldner, president of CARE International Deutschland (Germany)
 Krešimir Balenović
 Ante Bauer
 Ante Beljo
 Andreas Berlakovich 
 Niko Bulić
 Zdravka Bušić
 Ivica Gaži
 Marijan Hanžeković 
 Katica Ivanišević
 Josip Juras
 Franjo Kajfež
 Ivan Lacković Croata
 Sveto Letica
 Jozo Martinović
 Ivica Mudrinić
 Slobodan Novak
 Ivo Parać
 Josip Pavlišić
 Marijan Petrović
 Jadranko Prlić
 Ivan Rabuzin
 Adalbert Rebić
 Smiljko Sokol
 Kazimir Sviben
 Milovan Šibl
 Borislav Škegro
 Miroslav Tuđman
 Hasan Muratović

The order is also typically awarded to foreign ambassadors.

References

 Zakon o odlikovanjima i priznanjima Republike Hrvatske, NN 20/95 ("Law on Decorations", in Croatian)
 Hrvatska Odlikovanja, Narodne novine, Zagreb 1996.
 Pravilnik Reda kneza Trpimira s ogrlicom i Danicom, NN 108/00

Notes

Orders, decorations, and medals of Croatia
 
1995 establishments in Croatia
Awards established in 1995